The Armstrong House is a historic house located in North Adams, Massachusetts.  Built about 1875, it is a well-preserved example of a locally idiosyncratic Italianate style.  It was listed on the National Register of Historic Places on October 25, 1985.

Description and history 
The Armstrong House is located on a residential street on the north side of North Adams, on the east side of Brooklyn Street.  It is a two-story wood-frame structure, three bays wide, with a low hip roof supported by decorative brackets at the corners and studded with modillion blocks. Its main entrance is in the leftmost bay, with a portico that is also bracketed, with 20th-century columns and balustrade that are sympathetic to its Italianate style.  A single-story polygonal bay projects from the right side of the main block.  A two-story ell extends to the rear, connecting the house to a barn that is of the same vintage as the house, with an oculus window in its gable end.  Extending across the ell's side is a bracketed shed-roof porch.

The house was built in 1875, during North Adams' industrial boom time.  Its combination of features are a locally distinctive variant of the Italianate style, which is found repeated elsewhere in the community.  The house was built for W. W. Armstrong, a worker at the Arnold Print Works, and is considered one of North Adams' best-preserved Italianate houses.

See also
 National Register of Historic Places listings in Berkshire County, Massachusetts

References
Notes

Buildings and structures in North Adams, Massachusetts
Houses in North Adams, Massachusetts
Houses on the National Register of Historic Places in Berkshire County, Massachusetts
Houses completed in 1875
Italianate architecture in Massachusetts